Here, There Be Dragons is a fantasy novel by James A. Owen. It is the first book in The Chronicles of the Imaginarium Geographica series.  A sequel, followed by several more books, have since been released, including The Search for the Red Dragon (January 2008), The Indigo King (October 2008), The Shadow Dragons (October 2009), The Dragon's Apprentice (October 2010),  The Dragons of Winter (August 2012), The First Dragon  (November 2013), and a standalone sequel The Dragon Knight (Owen Novel)  (November 2020).

Plot synopsis
John, Charles, and Jack are three Oxford scholars united by the death of Stellan Sigurdsson, John's mentor, who thereafter receive The Imaginarium Geographica, which records mythical and fictional locations. When pursued by the anthropophagous, plural Wendigo, they are rescued by Bert, with whom they travel aboard the ship Indigo Dragon (captained by Bert's daughter Aven), to Avalon, and then to Paralon, the capital of the Geographicas 'Archipelago of Dreams', where they discover this Archipelago in an interregnum and discover that its social order can be restored by a descendant of Arthur Pendragon. Desirous of obtaining the royal 'Ring of Power', and thus the kingship, is the 'Winter King' (Mordred). Upon a visit to shipbuilder 'Ordo Maas' (Deucalion), the protagonists learn that the Winter King is using Pandora's Box to create the wraithlike 'Shadow-Born', his principal servants, from the citizens of lands conquered by himself. Fearing that the Winter King may gain an advantage by possession of the Imaginarium Geographica, they visit its author, the Cartographer of Lost Places, in his refuge, the Keep of Time, where they discover that their servant 'Artus' is a descendant of Arthur. Knowing this, they challenge the Winter King to pitched battle, wherein the still-loyal Elves, Dwarves, and Centaurs etc. oppose Shadow-Born, Trolls, and Goblins while Charles and the badger 'Tummeler' close Pandora's Box in secret. On the battlefield, Jack accidentally causes the death of Captain Nemo, while John and Artus approach the 'Ring of Power' (a ring of standing stones resembling Stonehenge) to summon the Archipelago's dragons, who rout the enemy. Mordred is cast from the Edge of the World by the dragon Samaranth. Upon return to their own world, John, Jack, Charles, and Bert are identified as J.R.R Tolkien, C.S. Lewis, Charles Williams, and H.G. Wells.

Characters
A number of people referenced in the novel were members of the Inklings, a literary discussion group at the University of Oxford, England, that produced some famous novelists.John (J.R.R. Tolkien) is an ex-soldier, but becomes the 'Caretaker Principia' of the Imaginarium Geographica after the former Caretaker Principa is killed. Initially unable to read the Geographica, he eventually becomes proficient in so doing, and thereafter guides the others.Jack (C.S. Lewis) is the youngest of the three central characters, having not yet attended university (Oxford). Early on he demonstrates the most imagination of the three; but his recklessness briefly costs him his integrity, and Captain Nemo's life. Thereafter he restores to their former characters, all the lands conquered by antagonist Mordred.Charles (Charles Williams) is editor of the Oxford Press. Contemptuous of lesser antagonist 'Magwich', but gradually befriended by the badger 'Tummeler'.Bert (H.G. Wells) is former Caretaker of the Imaginarium Geographica, alongside Stellan Sigurdsson and J.M. Barrie, and identified with the protagonist of the historic Wells' novel The Time Machine.Aven is the captain of the ship Indigo Dragon, on which the protagonists initially travel; the daughter of H.G. Wells by his character Weena.Bug/Artus is a boy who stows away on the Indigo Dragon after release from the service of three Norns. A descendant of King Arthur, and thus the heir to the Archipelago.The Winter King/Mordred/Captain Hook is the antagonist, desirous of conquering the Archipelago by control of its population's shadows, and eventually of the dragons that guard the Archipelago itself. He is defeated by the dragon Samaranth.Magwich is Mordred's spy and assistant, and formerly an apprentice to Charles Dickens. He is constantly threatened and beaten by the protagonists, among whom he briefly travels. In the end of the first book he becomes a Green Knight to protect Avalon.Tummeler is a talking badger who accompanies the protagonists—eventually to close Pandora's Box by the shield of Perseus (given him by Samaranth), and thus terminate Mordred's 'Shadow-Born'.Ordo Maas combines the characters of Thoth, Noah, and Deucalion. To him are attributed the sentient Dragonships: the Indigo Dragon, the Violet Dragon, the Blue Dragon, the Orange Dragon, the Yellow Dragon, the White Dragon and the Red Dragon (a modified Argo). An advisor to the protagonists.Samaranth' is the first dragon. Like Ordo Maas, he gives the protagonists advice and (among other dragons) aids them in the final battle.

References

External links

2006 American novels
The Chronicles of the Imaginarium Geographica
Modern Arthurian fiction
American fantasy novels